Ingrīda Latimira, formerly Ingrīda Ūdre, (born 14 November 1958) is a Latvian politician who belongs to the Latvian Farmers' Union political party.

Ūdre is a former professional basketball player who worked as an accountant after the end of her basketball career. She was first elected to Saeima, the Latvian parliament, in 1998, from the list of the New Party. She was the presidential candidate of the New Party in 1999.

In 2002, after the New Party ceased to exist, Ūdre joined the Latvian Farmers' Union and became the leader of the newly founded Union of Greens and Farmers. After the 2002 parliamentary election, she became Speaker of the Saeima. She served in this position until the 2006 election.

In 2004, Ūdre was nominated as Latvia's candidate for European Commission. Her nomination caused a major controversy. Ūdre was a replacement for Latvia's previous commissioner Sandra Kalniete. Ūdre was also criticised, by Delna (the Latvian chapter of Transparency International) and other anti-corruption NGOs, for campaign finance violations committed by the Union of Farmers and Greens, although her personal involvement in those violations was never proven. In October 2004, Latvia withdrew Ūdre's candidacy, nominating Andris Piebalgs instead of her.

In 2006, Ūdre failed to win reelection to Saeima. Her party, the Union of Farmers and Greens increased its number of seats in the parliament from 12 to 18. Ūdre, however, received a large number of personal "against" votes (Latvian election system allows voters to cast "for" and "against" votes for individual candidates of the party they support) and was not reelected because of that. This appears to be the only case in Latvian history when a political party has increased its representation but its leader was not reelected to the parliament.

References

1958 births
Living people
Politicians from Riga
New Party (Latvia) politicians
Latvian Farmers' Union politicians
Ministers of Economics of Latvia
Speakers of the Saeima
Deputies of the 7th Saeima
Deputies of the 8th Saeima
Candidates for President of Latvia
Women deputies of the Saeima
21st-century Latvian women politicians
Women legislative speakers
Recipients of the Order of the Cross of Terra Mariana, 1st Class